Legal tender is a form of currency 

Legal Tender may refer to:
Legal Tender, novel in the Rosato & Associates series
Legal Tender (film), a 1991 film
"Legal Tender" (song)
A series of restaurants in the historic Pflueger General Merchandise Store and Annex Saloon building